National Park railway station was a railway station in South Australia located on the Adelaide-Wolseley line in the suburb of Belair and within the boundaries of the Belair National Park. It was located 25.8 kilometres from Adelaide station.

History 

It is unclear when National Park railway station was opened. It consisted of one 80 metre platform with a waiting shelter, and was popular with bike riders on weekends.

The station closed on 23 September 1987, when the State Transport Authority withdrew Bridgewater line services between Belair and Bridgewater. The platform and shelter shed have since been demolished.

References

Disused railway stations in South Australia
Railway stations closed in 1987
1987 disestablishments in Australia